CODESUP is a private corporation in Pudahuel, Santiago, Chile founded by local private companies of Pudahuel in order to aim for sustainable development in particular in social, economic and environmental areas.

Structure of the corporation
As partners, CODESUP can count on many bodies in the commune, like almost all big companies and other organizations, corporations, schools, universities and trade unions.
Its associates are:

 Automotores Gildemeister S.A. - importer Hyundai Chile
 Banquetería Amelia Correa Izquierdo & Hijos
 Bodenor Flexcenter - logistics parks
 Carmell Grupo Inmobiliario
 CBP Centro de Bodegaje Pudahuel
 Cecinas San Jorge S.A.
 Cial Alimentos / Consorcio industrial de alimentos S.A.
 El Bosque S.A. - promoter of projects like URBANYA
 Enea
 Empresas Melón S.A. - concrete
 Gaasa
 Hidronor Chile S.A. - recycling
 Hilton Garden Inn
 Lo Boza Parque Industrial - industrial park
 Lomas de Hidronor
 Praderas PDUC Ciudad Lo Aguirre
 SCL, Terminal Aéreo Santiago S.A. - operator of the International Airport Santiago de Chile

People:
 Johnny Carrasco 
 Hans Hein 
 Julio Fernández

Services and projects
Generally, CODESUP works mostly through partnerships with various local or regional bodies, depending on the project. This can be done through own initiative and further integration of bigger partners, or above all through an intermediate role between the public and the private sector.

However, there is a great number of projects which CODESUP realizes on its own account, such as schooling, training and education projects in the fields of environment and business. Furthermore, it annually grants scholarships for theses in geography, economics and politics, which above all deal with local topics.

To be more specific, CODESUP integrates a network of institutions which dedicate themselves to sustainable local development. Of great importance is its integration in the Programa Santiago Emprende Norponiente (through Chile Emprende), composed by public services and which is destinated to fomento productivo (productive support) of small companies and people working on their own account. These public services consist mainly of the Servicio de Cooperación Técnica (SERCOTEC), the Servicio Nacional de Capacitación y Empleo (SENCE) and the Fondo de Solidaridad e Inversión Social (FOSIS). To these are added the municipalities of Pudahuel, Quilicura, Cerro Navia, Lo Prado and Quinta Normal, and many other associations such as the Asociación de Industrias del Area Norte de Santiago (Quilicura), the Asociación de Industrias de Quinta Normal (ASIQUINTA) and others of micro and small entrepreneurs. It works together with ProChile, a Chilean government agency specialized in the promotion of exports, and other academic and technical bodies with the overall goal of better monitoring the comuna Pudahuel.

Additionally, CODESUP maintains an international cooperation agreement with the Excelentísima Diputación Provincial de Cáceres, Extremadura, Spain, in the area of activities of superior formation in sustainable local administration and government, including Spanish and Chilean experts. The beneficiaries of these programmes are local leaders, professionals and functionaries of local authorities in Pudahuel. During 2007 and 2008 the focus was on the assistance on the implementation of the Agenda 21 in the comuna Pudahuel.

External links
 CODESUP - sitio oficial
 Municipalidad de Pudahuel - sitio oficial
 Artículo Tren Ligero de Superficie
 Proyecto Mapocho 42K

References

Organisations based in Santiago
Economy of Chile
Organizations established in 2002
2002 establishments in Chile
Economic development organizations
Non-profit organisations based in Chile